Norbert Varga (born 26 March 1980) is a Romanian footballer who plays as a defender or a midfielder for UTA Arad.

On 10 February 2006 Wisła Kraków manager Dan Petrescu bought him from Sportul Studenţesc for an undisclosed fee.

References

External links
 

1980 births
Living people
Sportspeople from Arad, Romania
Romanian footballers
Association football midfielders
FC UTA Arad players
FC Sportul Studențesc București players
Wisła Kraków players
CSM Unirea Alba Iulia players
Békéscsaba 1912 Előre footballers
Liga I players
Romanian expatriate footballers
Expatriate footballers in Poland
Expatriate footballers in Hungary
Romanian expatriate sportspeople in Poland
Romanian expatriate sportspeople in Hungary
Romanian sportspeople of Hungarian descent